Romualdas Ramanauskas (born 4 February 1950, Vilnius) is a Lithuanian film and theater actor.

Biography 
In 1972 he graduated from the Lithuanian Conservatoire. He worked for 20 years as an actor at the Lithuanian National Drama Theatre. In 1992 he moved to the Youth Theatre of Lithuania, in 2001, returned to LNDT (up to 2003).

Since 1970, he appeared in films, playing mostly roles of antagonists. His biggest role was of Richard Lozberg in the television series Long Road in the Dunes (1980-1981).

Selected filmography

 1970: The Damned Submission
 1972: Herkus Mantas
 1976: The Favorite
 1981: Long Road in the Dunes
 1982: Rich man, poor man
 1983: Anxious Sunday
 1984: European History
 1984: The Invisible Man
 1985: We charge
 1985: Karmelyuk
 1985: Option Zombie
 1986: Astrologer
 1987: The Invisible Man
 1989: Abduction of the Wizard
 1992: Doublet
 1992: In the mist
 1996: Judenkreis, or eternal wheel
 2007: War and Peace

References

External links
 

1950 births
Lithuanian male film actors
Living people
20th-century Lithuanian male actors
21st-century Lithuanian male actors
Soviet male film actors
Male actors from Vilnius